Philip Joseph Hughes (born June 24, 1986) is an American former professional baseball pitcher. He has played in Major League Baseball (MLB) for the New York Yankees, Minnesota Twins, and San Diego Padres from 2007 through 2018. He was the Yankees' first-round pick in the 2004 MLB draft.

During his time in the Yankees' minor-league system, Hughes was one of the most highly anticipated prospects in baseball, but his major league career was marked by inconsistency. He debuted in the major leagues in 2007 as a starting pitcher and quickly demonstrated his potential with a bid for a no-hitter in only his second MLB start. However, injury cut short his outing, as well as significant portions of his 2007 and 2008 seasons. Hughes began 2009 in the minors but later returned to the major leagues, eventually converting to a relief pitcher in June; pitching as a setup man for Mariano Rivera, Hughes excelled in the new role during the regular season. Despite his struggles in the postseason, Hughes won a championship with the Yankees in the 2009 World Series over the Philadelphia Phillies.

Upon returning to the starting rotation in 2010, he won 18 games and earned his first All-Star selection. Arm fatigue cost Hughes nearly half of the season in 2011, but the following year, he stayed healthy for the entire season, winning 16 games as the Yankees' third starter. In 2013, he had his worst season, posting a 4–14 win–loss record and 5.19 earned run average, a performance that led to his removal from the rotation. The following year, Hughes had a turnaround season with the Twins, where he went 16–10 with an ERA of 3.52 that resulted in him placing 7th in the American League Cy Young Award voting.

Early life
Hughes was born in Mission Viejo, California on June 24, 1986, and attended Foothill High School in North Tustin, California, where he was a first-team High School All-American pitcher and had one perfect game. In his junior year (2003), he had a 12–0 record and posted an 0.78 earned run average (ERA) while striking out 85 batters in 72 innings. In his senior year (2004), he had an 0.69 ERA and a 9–1 record. In 61 innings, he gave up 41 hits and three walks while striking out 83 batters.

Hughes first committed to Santa Clara University, but he chose to sign with the New York Yankees when they selected him in the first round, with the 23rd overall selection, of the 2004 Major League Baseball draft. The Yankees were awarded this pick as compensation when free agent pitcher Andy Pettitte signed with the Houston Astros.

Professional baseball career

Minor leagues
In 2004, Hughes pitched five scoreless innings for the rookie Gulf Coast League Yankees, striking out eight hitters. He spent 2005, his first full professional year, between the Class A Charleston RiverDogs and the Advanced A Tampa Yankees. He had a 9–2 record and a 1.24 ERA, and in  innings he gave up 54 hits while striking out 93.

After attending spring training with the Yankees in 2006, Hughes began the season with Tampa. He was promoted to the Double-A Trenton Thunder of the Eastern League at the beginning of May after he had a 2–3 record and a 1.80 ERA with Tampa while striking out 30 batters in 30 innings.

On June 13, Hughes took a no-hitter into the sixth inning and threw a one-hitter through seven innings in a 3–0 victory over the New Hampshire Fisher Cats. Ten days later, he put forth another dominant start, taking a no-hitter into the eighth inning and pitching eight shutout innings in a 4–0 win over the Connecticut Defenders. With Trenton, Hughes had a 10–3 record, a 2.25 ERA, and 138 strikeouts in 116 innings. He made one appearance in the Eastern League playoffs, earning a no-decision after pitching six innings of 1-run ball with 13 strikeouts. The game was the only postseason victory for the Thunder that year. After the season, he won the Kevin Lawn "Pitcher of the Year" Award as the top Yankees' minor league pitcher.

Entering 2007, Baseball America rated Hughes the Yankees' #1 prospect, said he had the best curveball and best control in the Yankee system, and called him "arguably the best pitching prospect in the minors." Baseball America also named him the fourth-best prospect in baseball. MiLB.com named Hughes the top right-handed starting pitching prospect in the AL East farm systems. In January 2007, the Yankees announced that Hughes was being invited to spring training. According to Bryan Hoch of MLB.com, scouts believed that Hughes was ready for the major leagues, but Yankees' general manager Brian Cashman said it was "unlikely" that Hughes would play for the Yankees in April. Hughes began 2007 pitching for the Triple-A Scranton/Wilkes-Barre Yankees of the International League (IL).

New York Yankees

2007
Following injuries to several Yankees' starters in 2007, Hughes was called up in April. Hughes made his major league debut on April 26 against the Toronto Blue Jays. In  innings, he allowed four runs on seven hits, earning his first career loss. In his second major league start on May 1 against the Texas Rangers, he was maintaining a no-hitter through  innings before pulling his left hamstring while facing his future teammate  Mark Teixeira. Mike Myers later allowed a hit, but Hughes earned his first career win. After the game, he was placed on the disabled list (DL). He returned on August 4 against the Kansas City Royals, allowing six runs in  innings and earning a no-decision in a 16–8 victory. In his final start of the year, on September 27 against the Tampa Bay Devil Rays, he allowed one run in a season-high seven innings and earned the win in a 3–1 victory. In 17 starts for the Yankees, Hughes had a 5–3 record, a 4.46 ERA, and 58 strikeouts in  innings pitched. He was the second-youngest American League (AL) player in 2007.

Hughes was included on the Yankees' postseason roster as a long reliever. He made his first postseason appearance in 2007 against the Cleveland Indians in the AL Division Series (ALDS), giving up one run in two innings in Game 1, a 12–3 loss. In Game 3, Hughes (the youngest player on the Yankees' roster) relieved an injured Roger Clemens (the oldest player on the roster) in the third inning and pitched  scoreless innings. He struck out four and earned his first playoff win. The Yankees were eliminated in four games in the series.

2008
Prior to the 2008 season, it was reported by numerous news sources that the Yankees were thinking of including Hughes in a trade to the Minnesota Twins for Johan Santana. The trade never happened; Santana was traded to the New York Mets instead.

Hughes began the 2008 season as the third starter in the Yankees' rotation. In his first six starts, he had an 0–4 record and a 9.00 ERA. On April 30, he was placed on the disabled list with a strained oblique and cracked rib. On a May 2 visit to an optometrist, Hughes was found to be slightly nearsighted.

After recovering from the rib injury, Hughes pitched for Scranton/Wilkes-Barre; he helped them win the 2008 International League title, earning the win after striking out 12 batters in the clinching game. On September 13, a day after the IL playoffs, Hughes was recalled by the Yankees. On September 17, Hughes made his first start since April 29, giving up one earned run over four innings and earning a no-decision in a 5–1 victory over the Chicago White Sox. In his final start of the season, on September 24, he gave up two runs in eight innings and received a no-decision in a ten-inning, 6–2 victory over Toronto. He finished the season with an 0–4 record, a 6.62 ERA, 23 strikeouts, and 34 innings pitched in eight starts. Because injuries severely limited his workload during the season, the Yankees sent Hughes to the Arizona Fall League after the season to pitch more innings.

2009
Although he had a solid performance in spring training, Hughes began the 2009 season in Triple-A. He was called up to the majors in April after Chien-Ming Wang was placed on the disabled list. Hughes made his first start of the season on April 28 against the Detroit Tigers and pitched six scoreless innings, earning his first win since 2007 in an 11–0 victory. On May 25, Hughes threw eight scoreless innings, earning the win in an 11–1 victory over the Rangers.

After he posted a 3–2 record and a 5.45 ERA in seven starts, Hughes was moved to the bullpen when Wang returned to the rotation in early June. Hughes pitched well, becoming the primary setup man to Mariano Rivera in July due to injuries to Brian Bruney and Dámaso Marte. Despite his success as a reliever, Cashman maintained that Hughes would be a starter over the long-term.

Hughes's first regular season win in relief came on July 17, when he threw two scoreless innings in a 5–3 victory over Detroit. On July 23, he recorded his first career save after a 6–3 Yankees victory over the Oakland Athletics. He relieved CC Sabathia in the eighth inning and pitched two perfect innings. From June 10 through July 3, he had a  inning scoreless streak, the longest by a Yankee reliever since Rivera had a  inning scoreless streak in 1999. In 44 games as a relief pitcher in 2009, Hughes posted a 1.40 ERA; he had 65 strikeouts in  innings.

Hughes pitched in all three games of the ALDS against the Minnesota Twins, posting a 9.00 ERA. In Game 5 of the AL Championship Series (ALCS) against the Los Angeles Angels of Anaheim, he suffered a loss when he gave up a run and also allowed an inherited runner to score in the 7–6 defeat. He had scoreless outings in Games 2 and 3 as the Yankees won the series in six games. He had a 16.20 ERA in the World Series, but he won his first World Series ring as the Yankees defeated the Philadelphia Phillies in six games.

2010
On March 25, 2010, Hughes was named the Yankees' fifth starter. Throughout the season, the Yankees occasionally had Hughes skip starts to limit his innings, in hopes that this would help him stay healthy. On April 21, Hughes carried a no-hitter into the eighth inning against the Athletics before allowing a leadoff single to Eric Chavez; he faced two more hitters prior to being relieved, having struck out 10 batters.

He won his first five decisions, a streak snapped May 22 by the New York Mets. He followed with another five-game win streak, the last coming against the Mets on June 19. After missing a start, he saw this win streak come to an end June 29 against the Seattle Mariners.

Hughes was named to the AL All-Star Team, Sunday, July 4. Five days after his first selection to the midsummer classic, Hughes threw seven innings and gave up one run to beat the Mariners 6–1. His next outing, the All-Star Game, did not go well. Hughes, after retiring the first batter he faced in the seventh inning, allowed a pair of singles to Scott Rolen and Matt Holliday before yielding to Matt Thornton; Rolen and Holliday scored the tying and go-ahead runs on Brian McCann's three-run double that proved decisive in the NL's 3–1 victory. On August 14, Hughes allowed three runs in six innings, earning the win in an 8–3 victory over the Kansas City Royals. It was the 50th start of Hughes's career, making him at 24 years and 51 days old the youngest Yankee to make his 50th start since Al Downing made his 50th start at 23 years and 61 days old in 1964. Hughes had 18 wins (tied for fourth in the AL with Trevor Cahill and Justin Verlander behind Sabathia, who had 21, and Jon Lester and David Price, who both had 19), only 8 losses, and a 4.19 ERA while striking out 146 batters in  innings of work. His run support of 6.48 runs per game was the highest in the major leagues.

Hughes made his first postseason start in Game 3 of the ALDS against the Twins. He threw seven shutout innings to earn the win in the clinching game of the series as the Yankees beat the Twins 6–1. Game 2 of the ALCS against the Rangers did not go as well for Hughes, who allowed seven runs in four innings and earned the loss as the Yankees were defeated 7–2. He allowed four runs in  innings in Game 6 and earned another loss as the Yankees lost 6–1 and were eliminated from the postseason.

2011
Hughes began the 2011 season as the third starter in the Yankees rotation. After opening the season 0–1 with a 13.94 ERA in three starts, Hughes was placed on the DL due to a dead arm syndrome. It was later revealed that Hughes had been suffering from shoulder inflammation. He underwent an arm strength rehabilitation program for several weeks. On July 6, he made his first start in nearly 3 months, pitching five innings, allowing two earned runs, striking out and walking two batters, in a 5–3 loss to the Cleveland Indians. On August 2, in a rain-shortened game, Hughes threw his first career shutout as the Yankees defeated the White Sox 6–0 in six innings. Late in September, Hughes was moved to the bullpen after back stiffness caused him to miss a start. In 17 games (14 starts), Hughes had a 5–5 record, a 5.79 ERA, and 47 strikeouts in  innings pitched.

Hughes was included on the Yankees' postseason roster as a relief pitcher. He had scoreless outings in Games 4 and 5 of the ALDS as the Yankees were defeated by the Detroit Tigers in five games.

2012

On January 16, 2012, Hughes signed a one-year deal worth $3.25 million that included incentives, effectively avoiding arbitration. His deal was a $500,000 raise from his 2011 season.

Hughes was the Yankees' third starter in 2012. He started the season averaging only four innings in his first four starts while posting a 1–3 record and a 7.88 ERA. From May to the end of the season, however, Hughes had a 15–10 record and a 3.90 ERA. He had a season-high four-game winning streak from May 22 through June 15. Hughes threw a complete game on June 3, allowing one run in a 5–1 win against the Tigers. On June 26, he threw eight shutout innings and earned the win in a 6–4 victory over Cleveland. He threw  shutout innings and earned the win on September 13 in a 2–0 victory over the Boston Red Sox. In 32 starts, Hughes had a 4.19 ERA and 165 strikeouts in  innings pitched. He was tied for sixth in the AL in wins (16, with Max Scherzer, Yu Darvish, and Hiroki Kuroda), but he also tied for eighth in the league in losses (13, with Dan Haren and Ervin Santana).

In Game 4 of the ALDS against the Baltimore Orioles, Hughes allowed one run in  innings but received a no-decision in a 13-inning, 2–1 loss. The Yankees won the series in five games. In Game 3 of the ALCS against Detroit, Hughes allowed one run in three innings before exiting with back stiffness; he took the loss as the Yankees lost 2–1. The Tigers swept the Yankees in four games.

2013
Hughes began the 2013 season on the DL with a bulging disc in his back. He returned from the DL on April 6, allowing four runs (three earned) in four plus innings and earning the loss as Detroit won 8–4. On May 15 against the Seattle Mariners, Hughes only lasted  of an inning after giving up seven runs, six hits, two walks, including a grand slam to former Yankee Raúl Ibañez in a 12–2 Yankee loss. It was the shortest start of his career and at the time the shortest non-injury start by a Yankee at the new Yankee Stadium.

After pitching to a 4–13 record and a 4.86 ERA, with a 5.71 ERA in the second half, the Yankees removed Hughes from the rotation on September 4, replacing him with David Huff. Hughes went 1–10 in home starts in 2013, making him just the second MLB pitcher to win fewer than two games when making at least 15 home starts in a season; the other being Phil Huffman of the Toronto Blue Jays in 1979. He has the third-highest ERA in Yankee history among pitchers with at least 500 innings pitched.

Minnesota Twins

2014
Hughes agreed to a three-year contract worth $24 million with the Minnesota Twins on November 30, 2013. The deal was confirmed by the Twins on December 5, 2013. His first start for the Twins came against the White Sox in Chicago on April 3. Hughes threw five innings, giving up four earned runs and striking out seven. He received a no-decision as the Twins won the game 10-9. His first win in a Twins uniform came in his fourth start, where he limited the Kansas City Royals to three earned runs over six innings in an 8-3 victory on April 20.

This win started a successful run of starts for Hughes, who notched eleven consecutive outings of at least six innings pitched. Over this stretch (April 20–June 17), Hughes went 7-2 while posting a 2.27 ERA and a 0.982 WHIP in  innings. He allowed three earned runs or less in all but one of these starts and gave up just three walks against 61 strikeouts. On June 1, Hughes faced the Yankees for the first time in his career, pitching at Yankees Stadium for the first time since signing with the Twins during the offseason. Despite his career struggles pitching in New York while he was in pinstripes (29-24 with a 4.96 ERA in the Bronx overall, and 28-21 with a 4.82 ERA and 71 home runs allowed (1.79 HR/9) at the new stadium), Hughes delivered his best outing of the season yet, giving up just two earned runs on three hits across eight innings and earning the win in a 7-2 victory. Three starts later, he pitched his first complete game in over two years, throwing eight innings of two-run ball in a tough loss against the Red Sox in Boston. Hughes would struggle in his final five starts before the All-Star break, despite a decent 3-2 record and throwing  innings, as he posted a 6.32 ERA and opponents hit .344 against him. Nonetheless, his 10 wins in the first half of the season made him one of eleven AL pitchers with double digit wins prior to the All-Star break.

Hughes started the second half of the season taking the loss in his first three starts, resulting in his ERA rising above 4.00 for the first time since early May. His first win since the All-Star break came on August 5 in San Diego against the Padres, where he struck out nine batters and allowed just one run in six innings of work. Hughes then went on another roll, winning his next three starts, the first time he earned the win in four consecutive starts since winning four straight from June 2–19, 2010.

Following his win in San Diego, Hughes also emerged by throwing at least seven innings in each of his nine outings over the rest of the season. Compiling a 5-2 record over this period, he also posted a 2.45 ERA and a 0.879 WHIP in 66 innings, with 59 strikeouts against just two walks and holding batters to a .221 average. In five of these nine starts, Hughes allowed one earned run or less, and recorded quality starts (three earned runs or less) in all but one of them. On September 13, Hughes struck out a career-high 11 batters over seven plus innings in a 5-1 loss to the White Sox, becoming the first Twins pitcher to strike out 10 or more batters in a single game in over two years (the last time being Francisco Liriano on July 12, 2012, a 379 game span). In his final start of the season on September 24, Hughes pitched eight innings of one-run ball with five strikeouts in his final start of the season, a 2-1 over the Diamondbacks. He ultimately ended the season setting a new record for the best strikeout-to-walk ratio posted by a starting pitcher in a single season in MLB history (11.625), breaking the previous record of 11.000 set by Bret Saberhagen 20 years earlier. Hughes closed his first season in Minnesota with a superb second half, pitching 88 innings across 13 starts and posting a 2.97 ERA (despite an average record of 6-5).

Hughes finished the 2014 season with a win–loss record of 16–10 alongside a career-best 3.52 ERA and 1.13 WHIP. He topped the 200 inning threshold for the first time, pitching  innings (10th-most in the AL) in 32 starts, which included 26 outings at least six innings thrown (20 of which were quality). He gave up 221 hits (fifth in the AL), while striking out a career-high 186 batters to go against a measly 16 walks, and posting a .268 opponent batting average.

In addition to establishing an overall career-best season, Hughes was seen as a Cy Young candidate by some baseball writers in large part due to his newly established record. Beyond leading all other major league starters in strikeout-to-walk ratio by over 4 points (as well posting as a personal best K/9 rate of 7.98), Hughes' BB/9 rate of 0.687 was the third-lowest mark ever posted by a starting pitcher in the Modern Era (behind Saberhagen and Carlos Silva). Furthermore, given that Hughes only gave up as many home runs (16) as he did walks during the 2014 season (thus posting an identical mark of 0.687 home runs per 9 innings, also a career-low), his 2.65 Fielding Independent Pitching (FIP) (a defense independent pitching statistic measuring a pitchers effectiveness to limit walks, homers and hits and accumulate strikeouts) showed off his incredible finesse (Hughes allowed no more than one walk in 30 of his 32 starts) and command of the strike zone (out of 3,046 pitches thrown, 2,224 of them (73.0%) landed in the strike zone, the best rate among all major league pitchers by a landslide) throughout the season.

Hughes received both of the Twins most prestigious player awards (the Joseph W. Haynes Pitcher of the Year Award and the Calvin R. Griffith MVP Award) for his outstanding performance throughout the season on an otherwise disappointing Twins team, who finished 22 games under .500 and last in the AL Central. He also finished seventh in the voting for the American League Cy Young Award behind David Price, Max Scherzer, Jon Lester, Chris Sale, Félix Hernández and winner Corey Kluber, receiving one fourth-place vote and four fifth-place votes for a total of six points. It marked the highest Cy Young voting finish for a Twins pitcher since Johan Santana won the award unanimously in 2006.

On December 22, 2014, Hughes and the Twins agreed on a three-year extension worth $42 million.

2015
Looking to build on the success of his 2014 season, Hughes went into the 2015 season as the Twins ace. He started 25 times while appearing two times out of the bullpen. Despite going 11–9, his ERA was 4.40 and allowed 29 home runs in  innings, the most across the majors.

2016
On June 9, 2016, Hughes was struck in the left knee off a line drive from J. T. Realmuto and left the game. The next day, he was placed on the 15-day disabled list due to left knee contusion. On June 11, it was revealed that there was a non-displaced fracture of the femur in the left knee. He was ruled out for 6–8 weeks. On June 12, he was transferred to the 60-day disabled list. On June 28, Hughes' season was declared over as he was set to undergo season ending surgery for thoracic outlet syndrome. He finished the 2016 season with a 1–7 record for the Twins with a 5.95 ERA.

2017
For the 2017 season, Hughes began the season as the Twins fourth starter. He went on the disabled list at the end of May due to biceps tendinitis. Upon his return from the disabled list, due to not being able to regain his complete stamina, Hughes agreed to head to the bullpen to build up strength. On July 18, Hughes was declared out for the season due to recurring symptoms due to the thoracic syndrome.

2018
Hughes was in the rotation at the beginning of the month but after two starts, he landed on the disabled list. Upon returning, he was sent to the bullpen. Hughes was designated for assignment by the Twins on May 22, 2018. Hughes ended his five year tenure with the Twins compiling a 32–29 record and a 4.43 ERA.

San Diego Padres
On May 27, 2018, the Twins traded Hughes, along with cash and the 74th pick in the 2018 MLB draft, to the San Diego Padres in exchange for minor-league catcher Janigson Villalobos. Upon being acquired, he was put in the bullpen. Hughes pitched to a 6.10 ERA in  innings. The Padres designated Hughes for assignment on August 10 and released him on August 16. In the 2018 season, batters facing Hughes accrued the highest percentage of barreled-balls per plate appearance and highest average exit velocity of any other pitcher in the major leagues.

On January 3, 2021, Hughes officially announced his retirement from professional baseball on his Twitter account.

Personal life
As a child, Hughes was a Boston Red Sox fan. He had a poster of Nomar Garciaparra with the slogan "Reverse the Curse" on his bedroom wall. Hughes is a Christian. His baseball glove has the reference for the Bible verse Philippians 4:13 on it, and Hughes has the entire verse ("I can do all things through Christ who strengthens me.") tattooed on his left arm. He enjoys watching the Food Network and is a fan of Alton Brown. He became a fan of the Tampa Bay Lightning in 2005, after he began training at the Yankees' facility in Tampa.

Hughes and his wife, Sarah, were married in November 2016. They welcomed their first child, a baby boy named Harrison, in the fall of 2019.

Hughes is an avid sports card collector. Since September 2019, he has recorded and published videos of himself opening packs to YouTube under the channel name Phil’s Pulls.

Scouting report

Hughes's pitch repertoire has varied over the years, although his main pitch has consistently been a four-seam fastball at 92–95 mph, and he has also relied on a spike curveball in the range of 73–77 mph. He has also developed a mid-80s Vulcan changeup against left-handed hitters, and in mid-2012, he developed a low-80s slider to right-handers.

Hughes added a cut fastball in the high 80s as a weapon against right-handers in the 2008 season, and he used the pitch 16% of the time in the 2009 and 2010 seasons:

By early 2011, Hughes's velocity on his fastball was down several mph; John Harper of the New York Daily News speculated that Hughes's overuse of the cutter was to blame, not a dead arm. Hughes continued to use the cutter into the start of the 2012 season; he posted a 7.88 ERA in April, throwing the cutter about 12% of the time in this span. In early May, Hughes dropped the cutter from his repertoire, using it only 1.2% of the time for the rest of the year.

Hughes throws a disproportionate number of his pitches high in the strike zone and above the zone.

Hughes asserts that the hamstring injury he suffered in his rookie year has permanently altered his pitching mechanics: "My stride, and things like that, have never quite been the same."

Awards and honors
 2004 – 1st team High School All-American P
 2006 – New York Yankees Minor League Player of the Year
 2007 – AL East Division Top Prospects (Right-handed starting pitcher)
 2007 – Baseball America's Top 100 prospects: #4.
 2009 – World Series champion
 2010 – American League All-Star

See also

 List of Major League Baseball single-inning strikeout leaders

References

External links

 Phil Hughes’s Official Blog on YardBarker
 Phil Hughes’s Old Blog
 YouTube channel

1986 births
Living people
New York Yankees players
Minnesota Twins players
San Diego Padres players
Gulf Coast Yankees players
Charleston RiverDogs players
Tampa Yankees players
Trenton Thunder players
Scranton/Wilkes-Barre Yankees players
Staten Island Yankees players
Sportspeople from Mission Viejo, California
Baseball players from California
Major League Baseball pitchers
American League All-Stars
Peoria Javelinas players